Laura Duncan may refer to:
 Laura Duncan (sheriff)
 Laura Duncan (singer)